Lambda Kappa Sigma ( or LKS) is an international pharmacy fraternity headquartered in Muskego, Wisconsin. Founded in 1913, it t was created to promote the profession of pharmacy among women and advance women within the profession. LKS is the oldest and largest professional pharmacy fraternity for women in the world. Lambda Kappa Sigma has initiated more than 30,000 members and has 45 chartered chapters. It also has 36 chartered alumni groups internationally.

History 
On , Ethel J. Heath and eight other female students at the Massachusetts College of Pharmacy organized Lambda Kappa Society, a social club. Charter members were: 
Ethel J. Heath
Annabel Carter Jones
Mary Connolly Livingston
Emma MacDonnell Cronin
Willette McKeever Cheever
Mary Durgin Loveland
Alice G. Coleman
Margaret M. Curran
Rosemond A. Guinn.

In 1915, the organization ceased being a luncheon club and was opened to all female members of the college. Sigma was added to the name, formally making it Lambda Kappa Sigma, and the official badge, motto, flower, and colors were selected. In 1919, the official coat of arms, designed by Cora E. Craven, was adopted.  

The first national convention was held in Boston, Massachusetts in 1926, beginning a biennial convention schedule. At this convention, the Eta chapter presented what became the fraternity's official prayer, and Delta chapter presented what became the official sorority song. Both the prayer and the song were adopted for national use in 1950.

The Silver Anniversary Convention was held in Boston, Massachusetts, in 1938. At that convention, the delegates voted to join the Professional Panhellenic Association, becoming the first pharmaceutical sorority in the PPA. On April 28, 1956,  became international with the addition of the Alpha Lambda chapter in Vancouver, British Columbia, Canada on the campus of the University of British Columbia. In 1980 an international office was established, with the addition of an executive director position in 1984.

The 1982 biennial convention was held at Pittsburgh, Pennsylvania, with the Delta chapter (University of Pittsburgh), Tau chapter (Duquesne University), and Tau Alumni as hosts. The 1996 biennial convention was held in St. Louis, Missouri, with the Alpha Zeta and Alpha Zeta Alumni chapters as hosts.

During the 1988 biennial convention, the members voted to delete all gender references from the fraternity's membership requirements. The fraternity was now open to both male and female members, following a twelve-year battle to legally remain a fraternity for women only.

Philanthropy 
In 1964, Project Hope was adopted as the fraternity's international philanthropy. Lambda Kappa Sigma also has an educational grant program.

Publications 
Blue and Gold Triangle - official publication of fraternity, established 1926
Alumni News - informational alumni-only mailing
LinKS - official publication of student chapters and advisors

Chapters

Collegiate
Following are the collegiate chapters of Lambda Kappa Sigma. Active chapters are indicated in bold. Inactive chapters are in italic.

Alumni
Following are the alumni chapters of Lambda Kappa Sigma in order of charter date. Active chapters are indicated in bold. Inactive chapters are in italic.

Notes

See also
 Professional fraternities and sororities
 Rho Chi, co-ed, pharmacy honor society

References

1913 establishments in Massachusetts
Organizations based in Wisconsin
Student organizations established in 1913
Professional pharmaceutical fraternities and sororities in the United States
Professional Fraternity Association